Heliocopris bucephalus, commonly known as Elephant dung beetle, is a species of dung beetle found in India, Sri Lanka, Bangladesh, Myanmar, Malay Peninsula, Java, Vietnam, Laos, and Cambodia.

Description
This large, broad, globular and quadrate species has an average length of about 39 to 55 mm. Body black whereas elytra and ventrum usually deep red in color. Legs and ventrum covered with coarse rust-red hair. Small head and pronotum coarsely rugose. Elytra very smooth and shining. Clypeus moderately finely, vertex more coarsely, and transversely strigose. Pronotum very unevenly rugose or reticulate. Elytra are very lightly striate. Male smaller than female and more reddish. Female basically black in color. Male possess a slender, curved and pointed horn, a maximum and minor phase with changes in the head and pronotum. But in female, head strongly transverse with transverse carina.

Adults are common at night, in the months of August and September. The urease-negative basidiomycetous yeast called Trichosporon heliocopridis is known to associated with the adult beetles of the species. In Thailand, it is also considered as an edible food.

Gallery

References 

Scarabaeinae
Insects of Sri Lanka
Insects of India
Insects described in 1775